Ron (Hebrew: רוֹן) is a given name. It is mostly used as a shortening of the name Ronald, but is also Hebrew for "joy". People with this name include:

People with the name
Ron Atias (born 1995), Israeli taekwondo athlete
Ron Baker (born 1993), American basketball player
Ron Balicki (born 1963), American actor and stuntman
Ron Blomberg (born 1948), American major league baseball player
Ron Brooks (born 1988), American football player
Ron Clinkscale (born 1933), American football player
Ron Darmon (born 1992), Israeli Olympic triathlete
Ron DeSantis, governor of Florida
Ron Francis (born 1963), Canadian hockey player
Ron Gardenhire (born 1957), American baseball player and manager
Ron Gillham, American politician
Ron Hopkins (born 1960), American football player
Ron Howard (born 1954), American actor and director
Ron Jeremy (born 1953), American pornographic actor
Ron Kaplan (born 1970), Israeli Olympic gymnast
Ron Keselowski (born 1946), former NASCAR Cup Series driver
Ron Ng (born 1979), Hong Kong actor
Ron McNair (1950–1986), American astronaut who died during the launch of the Space Shuttle Challenger.
Ron Mix (born 1938), American All-Pro Hall of Fame football player
Ron Paul (born 1935), American politician
Ron Perlman (born 1950), American actor
Ron Reeves (born 1938), Australian rules footballer
Ron Reeves (gridiron football) (born 1960), American football player
Ron Reagan (born 1958), American former radio host, political analyst, and son of Ronald Reagan, the 40th President of the United States
Ron Rivera (born 1962), American football player and coach
Ron Robin (born 1951), Israeli historian and President of the University of Haifa
Ron Rubin (voice actor) (born 1959), Canadian voice actor
Ron Rubin (bridge player) (born 1948), American bridge player
Ron Santo (1940–2010), American baseball player
Ron Stern (born 1967), Canadian ice hockey player
Ron Torten (born 1966), Israeli Olympic competitive sailor
Ron Vlaar (born 1985), Dutch football (soccer) player
Ron Williamson (1953-2004), American baseball player wrongly convicted of rape and murder

Fictional people with the name
Ron (King of Fighters), a video game character
Ron Weasley, a main character from Harry Potter, best friend of Harry Potter, married to Hermione Granger.
Ron Stoppable, Kim Possible's sidekick from the Disney animated series Kim Possible
Ron Swanson, the mustachioed libertarian director of the eponymous department in the sitcom Parks and Recreation.
Ron Burgundy, lead character of the films Anchorman: The Legend of Ron Burgundy and Anchorman 2: The Legend Continues
Ron Troupe, a fictional character appearing in comic books published by DC Comics.

See also
Ron (disambiguation)

English masculine given names